Poltinino is a rural locality (a village) in Pertsevskoye Rural Settlement, Gryazovetsky District, Vologda Oblast, Russia. The population was 12 as of 2002.

Geography 
Poltinino is located 18 km north of Gryazovets (the district's administrative centre) by road. Lupochino is the nearest rural locality.

References 

Rural localities in Gryazovetsky District